Alexander Ivanovich Koldunov (20 September 1923 – 7 June 1992) was one of the highest-scoring flying aces of the Soviet Union during World War II and a twice recipient of the title Hero of the Soviet Union.

Early life 
Koldunov was born on 20 September 1923 to a Russian family. In 1931 the family moved to the Moscow area, and in 1940 he completed his ninth grade of school in addition to graduating from the local aeroclub. Koldunov joined the Soviet Army in February 1941. He graduated from the Kacha Military Aviation School in 1943 and was assigned to the 8th Reserve Aviation Regiment before being sent to the war front.

World War II
In May 1943 Koldunov was transferred to the 866th Fighter Aviation Regiment and deployed to the war front.

He was first awarded the title Hero of the Soviet Union on 2 August 1944, having been nominated for the title on 22 May 1944 for his first 15 shootdowns.

On 7 November 1944 he was credited with shooting down of three USAAF P-38 Lightnings of the 82nd Fighter Group in a 'friendly fire' incident near Belgrade during the air battle over Niš. In that episode he defended a column of Soviet ground troops that came under attack by American fighters. Accounts on the number of American and Soviet casualties widely vary, but it is certain that among the Soviet troops on the ground who were killed was lieutenant-general Grigory Kotov.

By the end of the war, he had flown 412 sorties, fought in 96 aerial engagements, gained one shared shootdown and 46 solo victories. He was nominated for the title of Hero of the Soviet Union again on 12 June 1945, but it was not awarded until 23 February 1948.

Postwar 
Remaining in military service after the war, he transferred from the Soviet Air Force to the Soviet Air Defence Force in the early 1960s. Koldunov was appointed as the Commander of the Moscow Air Defence District in November 1970. After a promotion to Colonel-General in 1972, in December 1975 Koldunov became the First Deputy Chief of Defence Forces. In 1977 he was promoted to Marshal of Aviation and the following year Koldunov was appointed to command the entire Air Defence Force. In 1984 he was promoted to Chief Marshal of Aviation, one of only a handful of officers to hold this very senior rank.

Koldunov was dismissed in May 1987 after Mathias Rust, a civilian German pilot flew from Finland to Moscow and landed nearby the Red Square. Koldunov died on 7 June 1992 and was buried at Novodevichy Cemetery in Moscow.

Awards and honors

Soviet 

 Twice Hero of the Soviet Union
 Three Order of Lenin
 Six Order of the Red Banner
 Order of Alexander Nevsky
 Two Order of the Patriotic War 1st class
 Order of the Red Star
 Lenin Prize

Foreign states 

 Yugoslavia - Order of the Partisan Star 2nd class
 East Germany - Patriotic Order of Merit 2nd class
 Bulgaria - Order of the People's Republic 2nd class
 Bulgaria - Order of Georgi Dimitrov
 Romania - Order of Tudor Vladimirescu 5th class
 Mongolia - Medal "For Military Merit"
 Hungary - Order of the Flag
 Vietnam - Military Exploit Order

References

Bibliography 
 
 

|-

1923 births
1992 deaths
People from Smolensk Oblast
People from Smolensky Uyezd
Central Committee of the Communist Party of the Soviet Union members
Ninth convocation members of the Soviet of Nationalities
Tenth convocation members of the Soviet of Nationalities
Eleventh convocation members of the Soviet of Nationalities
Soviet Air Force marshals
Soviet Air Defence Force officers
Soviet World War II flying aces
Heroes of the Soviet Union
Recipients of the Order of the Red Banner
Recipients of the Order of Alexander Nevsky
Burials at Novodevichy Cemetery